This article contains a list of awards and nominations for Monica, an American singer discovered by music producer Dallas Austin in 1991. The singer achieved worldwide success in 1998 with her album The Boy Is Mine, and hits "The Boy Is Mine", "For You I Will", and "So Gone". The singer received her first awards at 1996 "Billboard Music Award" for R&B Artist of the Year. She was later nominated for a Grammy for Record of the Year.

The first single from The Boy Is Mine as self-title, was a hit, reaching number one in multiple countries including Canada, New Zealand and on the Billboard Hot 100. Both singers won five Billboard Music Award for "The Boy Is Mine" with Top Dance Maxi-Single, Best Clip, and Top 100 Singles Sales and a Grammy Award for Best R&B Performance By a Duo or Group.

American Music Awards
The American Music Awards is an annual awards ceremony created by Dick Clark in 1973. Monica has received one nominations.

|-
|  || Herself || Favorite Soul/R&B New Artist || 
|-

BET Awards
The BET Awards were established in 2001 by the Black Entertainment Television (BET) network. Monica has received one awards from two nominations.

|-
| 2004 || Herself || Best Female R&B Artist || 
|-
|rowspan="2"| 2010 || Herself || Centric Award || 
|-
| "Everything to Me" || Viewer's Choice ||

Billboard Music Awards

|-
|rowspan="2" | 1996 || Herself || R&B Artist of the Year || 
|-
|| Herself || Top R&B Artist|| 
|-
|rowspan="3"| 1998 || "The Boy Is Mine" || Top Hot 100 Song|| 
|-
| "The Boy Is Mine" || Top R&B Song || 
|-
| "The Boy Is Mine" || Female Hot 100 Artist of the Year || 
|-
| 2004 || Herself || R&B/Hip-Hop Artist of the Year - Female || 
|-
|rowspan="2"| 2011 || Herself || Top R&B Artist || 
|-
| "Still Standing" || Top R&B Album || 
|-

Billboard Music Video Awards

|-
|rowspan="2"|1995
|Don't Take It Personal
|Best R&B/Urban Clip
|
|-
|Don't Take It Personal
|Best New R&B/Urban Artist Clip
|
|-
|rowspan="2"|1998
|rowspan="2"|The Boy Is Mine
|Best R&B/Urban Clip
|
|}

Grammy Awards
The Grammy Awards are awarded annually by the National Academy of Recording Arts and Sciences.

|-
|rowspan="2"|1999 
|rowspan="2"|"The Boy Is Mine" || Record of the Year || 
|-
| Best R&B Performance by a Duo or Group with Vocals || 
|-
|rowspan="2"|2011 || "Everything to Me" || Best Female R&B Vocal Performance || 
|-
|Still Standing || Best R&B Album || 
|-

MOBO

The MOBO Awards (an acronym for Music of Black Origin) were established in 1996 by Kanya King. They are held annually in the United Kingdom to recognize artists of any race or nationality performing music of black origin.

|-
| 1998 || "The Boy Is Mine" || Best International Single ||

MTV Video Music Awards
The MTV Video Music Awards is an annual awards ceremony established in 1984 by MTV. Monica has received two nominations.

|-
|rowspan="2"| 1998  || "The Boy Is Mine" || Best R&B Video|| 
|-
| "The Boy Is Mine" || Video of the Year||

NAACP Image Awards

|-
| 1996 || Herself || Outstanding New Artist|| 
|-
|rowspan="2"|1999
|rowspan="1"|Brandy & Monica
|Outstanding Duo or Group (for "The Boy Is Mine")
|
|-
|rowspan="1"|Brandy & Monica
|Outstanding Music Video (for "The Boy Is Mine")
|
|-
| 2000 || Herself || Outstanding Female Artist||

Soul Train Music Awards

The Soul Train Music Awards is an annual awards show that honors black musicians and entertainers. Monica has received one award out of twelve nominations.

|-
|rowspan="3" | 1996 || "Like This and Like That" / "Before You Walk Out of My Life" || Best R&B/Soul Single - Female || 
|-
|| Miss Thang || Best R&B/Soul Album - Female || 
|-
|| Herself || Best R&B/Soul or Rap New Artist || 
|-
| 1997 || "Why I Love You So Much" || Best R&B/Soul Single - Female|| 
|-
| 1998 || "For You I Will" || Best R&B/Soul Single - Female || 
|-
| 1999 || "The Boy Is Mine" || Best R&B/Soul Single; Group, Band or Duo  (with Brandy)|| 
|-
| 2007 || The Makings of Me || Best R&B/Soul Album - Female || 
|-
| 2009 || "Trust" (with Keyshia Cole) || Best Collaboration|| 
|-
|rowspan="2"| 2010 || Herself || Best R&B/Soul Artist - Female || 
|-
| "Everything to Me" || Song of the Year || 
|-
|rowspan="2"|2020
|Herself
|Soul Train Certified Award 
|
|-
|Herself
|Lady of Soul Award
|

Soul Train Lady of Soul Awards

|-
| rowspan=2| 1996 || "Like This and Like That" / "Before You Walk Out of My Life" || Best R&B Soul Single - Solo || 
|-
| Miss Thang || R&B/Soul Album of the Year - Solo||   
|-
| rowspan=3| 1999 || "The Boy Is Mine" || Best R&B/Soul Single, Group, Band Or Duo (with Brandy) || 
|-
| "Angel of Mine" || Best R&B Soul Single - Solo || 
|-
| The Boy Is Mine || R&B/Soul Album of the Year - Solo|| 
|-
| 2003 || "So Gone" || Best R&B/Soul Single - Solo ||

Source Hip-Hop Music Awards

|-
| 2004 || Herself || R&B Artist of the Year — Female||

Teen Choice Awards

|-
|rowspan=3 | 1999 || Herself || Choice Music: Female Artist || 
|-
|The Boy Is Mine || Choice Music: Album || 
|-
|Angel of Mine || Choice Music: Love Song|| 
|-
|2003 || So Gone || Choice Music: R&B/Hip-Hop Track ||

YoungStar Awards

|-
|1998
|Herself
|Best Performance by a Young Recording Group or Artist
|
|}

References

Monica